Apibacter raozihei is a Gram-negative, rod-shaped, facultatively anaerobic and non-motile bacterium from the genus of Apibacter which has been isolated from feces from the  bat species Hipposideros and Taphozous from Chongqing in China.

References

Flavobacteria
Bacteria described in 2020